Scott Township is one of seventeen townships in Kosciusko County, Indiana. As of the 2010 census, its population was 1,696 and it contained 493 housing units.

Scott Township was organized in 1848.

Geography

References

External links
 Indiana Township Association
 United Township Association of Indiana

Townships in Kosciusko County, Indiana
Townships in Indiana